Broken Bow is a city in Custer County, Nebraska, United States. The population was 3,559 at the 2010 census. It is the county seat of Custer County.

History
Broken Bow was platted in 1882. Its name, likely suggested by a settler who found a broken bow in a field at the site of a former Native American camping ground, was submitted by homesteader Wilson Hewitt to the U.S. Post Office Department. The railroad was built through Broken Bow in 1884, and the town was incorporated as a village that same year. Broken Bow was incorporated as a city of the second class in 1888.

Geography

The geographic center of Nebraska lies approximately 10 miles southwest of Broken Bow.

Climate

Demographics

2010 census
As of the census of 2010, there were 3,559 people, 1,575 households, and 909 families living in the city. The racial makeup of the city was 95.7% White, 0.4% African American, 0.7% Native American, 0.1% Asian, 1.3% from other races, and 1.7% from two or more races. Hispanic or Latino of any race were 2.8% of the population.

There were 1,575 households, of which 27.9% had children under the age of 18 living with them, 43.8% were married couples living together, 10.3% had a female householder with no husband present, 3.6% had a male householder with no wife present, and 42.3% were non-families. 38.7% of all households were made up of individuals, and 20.1% had someone living alone who was 65 years of age or older. The average household size was 2.19 and the average family size was 2.90.

The median age in the city was 41.9 years. 24.8% of residents were under the age of 18; 6.4% were between the ages of 18 and 24; 22.4% were from 25 to 44; 24.1% were from 45 to 64; and 22.2% were 65 years of age or older. The gender makeup of the city was 47.1% male and 52.9% female.

2000 census
As of the census of 2000, there were 3,491 people, 1,509 households, and 917 families living in the city. The population density was 2,148.8 people per square mile (832.0/km2). There were 1,721 housing units at an average density of 1,059.3 per square mile (410.2/km2). The racial makeup of the city was 98.22% White, 0.17% African American, 0.66% Native American, 0.09% Asian, 0.11% from other races, and 0.74% from two or more races. Hispanic or Latino of any race were 0.80% of the population.

There were 1,509 households, out of which 27.0% had children under the age of 18 living with them, 51.2% were married couples living together, 7.9% had a female householder with no husband present, and 39.2% were non-families. 36.2% of all households were made up of individuals, and 18.8% had someone living alone who was 65 years of age or older. The average household size was 2.21 and the average family size was 2.88.

In the city, the population was spread out, with 23.9% under the age of 18, 6.2% from 18 to 24, 22.7% from 25 to 44, 22.3% from 45 to 64, and 24.9% who were 65 years of age or older. The median age was 43 years. For every 100 females, there were 84.4 males. For every 100 females age 18 and over, there were 78.3 males.

As of 2000 the median income for a household in the city was $29,355, and the median income for a family was $37,750. Males had a median income of $26,552 versus $20,132 for females. The per capita income for the city was $17,571. About 9.6% of families and 14.4% of the population were below the poverty line, including 22.8% of those under age 18 and 9.1% of those age 65 or over.

Economy
Nebraska's largest cattle feedlot, the Adams Land and Cattle south lot, with a capacity of 85,000 head, is located 2 miles south of Broken Bow.  In the past, some locals have feared the potential of environmental damage from the feedlot, but the state's environmental agency has found the company in compliance with state standards.

A family owned feed store, Evans Feed, opened in 1927. The town also has a grocery and a nursing home.

Notable people
Bettina Bedwell, journalist and fashion designer
Solomon Butcher, photographer of the homestead era in central Nebraska, lived in Broken Bow from 1915 to 1926.
 Earl Cooper, race car driver in Motorsports Hall of Fame of America
 Augustin Reed Humphrey, Congressman
 Omer Madison Kem, populist Congressman, 1890-1896
 Kent McCloughan, football player for University of Nebraska and Oakland Raiders

In popular culture

 The Marty Robbins song "Prairie Fire" tells the story of cattle drivers racing a prairie fire from Broken Bow to the Platte River
 Referenced in "The Showers", a book by author Dylan Sindelar.
 Several references to Broken Bow were made in the film Run Hide Fight produced by The Daily Wire

References

External links

 City of Broken Bow
 Chamber of Commerce website

Cities in Nebraska
Cities in Custer County, Nebraska
County seats in Nebraska
Populated places established in 1882
1882 establishments in Nebraska